Lee's Creek Township is one of thirty-seven townships in Washington County, Arkansas, USA. As of the 2000 census, its total population was 640.

Lee's Creek Township was established in 1880.

Geography
Devil's Den State Park makes up the southern tip of the township. The township was created from parts of Cove Creek Township and Crawford Township in 1880.

Cities, towns, villages
Blackburn

Cemeteries
The township contains Blackburn Cemetery.

Major routes
  Interstate 540
  Arkansas Highway 74
  Arkansas Highway 170

References

 United States Census Bureau 2008 TIGER/Line Shapefiles
 United States National Atlas

External links
 US-Counties.com
 City-Data.com

Townships in Washington County, Arkansas
Populated places established in 1880
1880 establishments in Arkansas
Townships in Arkansas